The 1956 United States Senate elections were elections for the United States Senate that coincided with the re-election of President Dwight D. Eisenhower. The 32 seats of Class 3 were contested in regular elections, and three special elections were held to fill vacancies. Although Democrats gained two seats in regular elections, the Republicans gained two seats in special elections, leaving the party balance of the chamber unchanged.

Democrats defeated incumbents Herman Welker (R-Idaho), George H. Bender (R-Ohio), and James H. Duff (R-Pennsylvania), as well as winning a Republican-held seat in Colorado. Republicans defeated incumbent Earle C. Clements (D-Kentucky) as well as winning Democratic-held seats in Kentucky, New York, and West Virginia. Thus, this election caused Kentucky's Senate delegation to flip from two Democrats to two Republicans.

During the next Congress, Republican John D. Hoblitzell Jr. was appointed to the seat of deceased Senator Matthew M. Neely (D-WV), while Democrat William Proxmire won a special election for the seat of deceased Senator Joseph McCarthy (R-Wisconsin). Also, Democrat Ralph Yarborough won a special election for the seat of Price Daniel (D-Texas), who had resigned from the Senate after being elected Governor of Texas. The net result was to leave the party balance unchanged.

Results summary

Colored shading indicates party with largest share of that row.

Source: Clerk of the U.S. House of Representatives

Gains, losses, and holds

Retirements
One Republican and five Democrats retired instead of seeking re-election.

Defeats
Four Republicans and one Democrat sought re-election but lost in the general election.

Change in composition

Before the elections

Elections results

Race summaries

Special elections during the 84th Congress
In these special elections, the winners were seated during 1956 or in 1957 before January 3; ordered by election date, then state.

Races leading to the 85th Congress
In these regular elections, the winners were elected for the term beginning January 3, 1957; ordered by state.

All of the elections involved the Class 3 seats.

Closest races 
Fifteen races had a margin of victory under 10%:

Alabama

Arizona

Arkansas

California

Colorado

Connecticut

Florida

Georgia

Idaho

Illinois

Indiana

Iowa

Kansas

Kentucky

Two elections in Kentucky converted both seats from Democratic to Republican. As a result, this marked the first time since 1916 that both Senate seats in a state flipped from one party to the other in a single election cycle.

Kentucky (special)

Following the death of Alben Barkley on April 30, 1956, Robert Humphreys was appointed June 21, 1956 to continue the term, pending a special election. Humphreys did not run in the special election to finish the term that would end in 1961.

Republican former-senator John Sherman Cooper, who had twice won special elections to that seat in 1946 and 1952, was again elected to finish the term.

This time, however, Cooper would be re-elected in 1960 and again in 1966, serving until his 1973 retirement.

Kentucky (regular)

First-term Democrat Earle Clements lost re-election to Republican Thruston B. Morton, who was Eisenhower's Assistant Secretary of State for Legislative Affairs.

Louisiana

Maryland

Missouri

Nevada

New Hampshire

New York

In New York, the Republican state convention met on September 10 at Albany, New York, and nominated New York State Attorney General Jacob K. Javits.  The Democratic state convention met on September 10 at Albany, New York, and nominated Mayor of New York City Robert F. Wagner Jr., for the U.S. Senate.  The Liberal Party endorsed the Democratic nominee, Mayor Robert F. Wagner Jr., for the U.S. Senate. On October 1, a movement was launched to vote for General of the Army Douglas MacArthur as a write-in candidate for the U.S. Senate. On October 2, MacArthur disavowed the campaign, and stated that he was not a candidate.

The Republican candidate was elected.

North Carolina

North Dakota

In North Dakota, the incumbent, Republican Milton Young, sought and received re-election to his third term, defeating North Dakota Democratic-NPL Party candidate Quentin N. Burdick, son of North Dakota congressman Usher L. Burdick.

Only Young filed as a Republican, and the endorsed Democratic candidate was Quentin Burdick, the son of well-known politician Usher Burdick, and former candidate for Governor of North Dakota. Young and Burdick won the primary elections for their respective parties.

One independent candidate, Arthur C. Townley, also filed before the deadline. Townley would later seek the state's other senate seat in 1958, and was known for creating the National Non-Partisan League.

Ohio

Oklahoma

Oregon

In Oregon, Republican-turned-Independent-turned-Democrat Wayne Morse decided to seek re-election for his first full term as a Democrat. Morse defeated Republican candidate Douglas McKay in the hotly contested general election.

Pennsylvania

In Pennsylvania, incumbent Republican U.S. senator James H. Duff sought re-election to another term, but was defeated by the Democratic nominee, Joseph S. Clark Jr.

South Carolina

In South Carolina the regular election was held simultaneously with the special election.

South Carolina (regular)

Incumbent Democrat Olin D. Johnston handily defeated Republican mayor of Clemson Leon P. Crawford. Olin D. Johnston, the incumbent Senator, faced no opposition from South Carolina Democrats and avoided a primary election. Leon P. Crawford, the mayor of the town of Clemson in the Upstate, faced no opposition from South Carolina Republicans and avoided a primary election.  Crawford campaigned as a defender of states' rights and denounced Johnston for backing the New Deal and the Fair Deal. The state Republican Party believed that Crawford could have a chance in the election if he galvanized the 128,000 registered black voters, although they were weary of being labeled as the black party. In the end, Johnston remained highly popular with the voters who were still leery of the Republican party and he easily defeated Crawford in the general election.

South Carolina (special)

The special election resulted from the resignation of Senator Strom Thurmond on April 4, 1956, who was keeping a campaign pledge he had made in the 1954 election. Thurmond was unopposed in his bid to complete the remaining four years of the term. Senator Strom Thurmond faced no opposition from South Carolina Democrats and avoided a primary election. There was a possibility that Governor George Bell Timmerman Jr. might enter the race, but Thurmond was held in such high regard by the voters that there would have been no chance of defeating Thurmond. With no challenge to the remainder of the term, Thurmond did not conduct a campaign and rejoined his old law firm in Aiken until he returned to the Senate after the general election.

South Dakota

Utah

Vermont

In Vermont, incumbent Republican George Aiken ran successfully for re-election to another term in the United States Senate, defeating Democratic challenger Bernard G. O'Shea.

Washington

West Virginia (special)

Following the death of Harley M. Kilgore on February 28, 1956, William Laird III was appointed to fill this seat and assumed office on March 13, 1956. Laird did not opt to run in the special election to fill the remainder of Kilgore's term through the end of the 85th Congress on January 3, 1959. , this is the last time the Republicans have won West Virginia's Class 1 seat. This was also the last time until 2014 that the Republicans won a U.S. Senate election in the state.

Wisconsin 

Incumbent Republican Senator Alexander Wiley easily won reelection to a fourth and final term, defeating the Democratic candidate, Henry W. Maier, by a margin of 17.4%. This would be the last time a Republican would win a Senate race in Wisconsin until Bob Kasten in 1980, and the last time a Republican would win more than 2 terms until Ron Johnson's victory in 2022.

See also
 1956 United States elections
 1956 United States presidential election
 1956 United States House of Representatives elections
 1956 United States gubernatorial elections
 84th United States Congress
 85th United States Congress

Notes

References

Sources
1956 U.S. Senate Election results

 
 
 

 
November 1956 events in the United States